Wildfang is a US-based apparel company known for its untraditional approach to gender norms. The company was founded in 2012 by Emma Mcilroy, Taralyn Thuot and Julia Parsley, who previously worked at Nike, Inc. in Portland, Oregon.

References

External links

Clothing companies of the United States
Companies based in Portland, Oregon
American companies established in 2010
2010 establishments in Oregon